The Izaak Walton Inn is a historic inn in Essex, Montana, USA.  It was originally built as the Izaak Walton Hotel in 1939 by the Great Northern Railway as a soup kitchen and lodgings for railway workers. The hotel was also originally envisioned as a potential official southern gateway to Glacier National Park, hence its size, but World War II intervened and that plan never materialized. Today, the inn is served by Essex station, the only request stop on Amtrak's Empire Builder route. A van from the inn meets both the morning eastbound and the evening westbound Empire Builders to convey passengers between the station and the inn.

The Tudor Revival inn is named after Sir Izaak Walton, the English writer and fisherman. Its location, Essex, was originally named Walton. The structure was listed on the National Register of Historic Places in 1985. Before its construction, rail crews had to find lodgings best they could among the then about 400 inhabitants of Essex, with many having to shelter in abandoned railcars or tents even during the winter. Before the Inn was built, there was only a "beanery", a restaurant with no lodging facilities (built 1910 and 1920s; both structures destroyed by fire).

The inn has 33 rooms for rent within the inn itself, with some other space available in refurbished cabooses, EMD F45 Diesel Locomotive 441, etc. It has been privately owned since the 1950s. The Izaak Walton Inn is open year-round, except for several weeks during the off season.

Gallery

References
 National Archives Catalog entry for Montana SP Izaak Walton Inn

 December 2022 sale to LOGE Camps

Further reading

External links

National Register of Historic Places in Glacier National Park
Great Northern Railway (U.S.) hotels
Hotel buildings on the National Register of Historic Places in Montana
Tourist attractions in Flathead County, Montana
National Register of Historic Places in Flathead County, Montana
1939 establishments in Montana
Hotel buildings completed in 1939
Tudor Revival architecture in Montana